Milton Keynes railway station could mean any of the six stations in the Milton Keynes urban area:
 Bletchley railway station
 Bow Brickhill railway station
 Fenny Stratford railway station
 Milton Keynes Central railway station
 Wolverton railway station
 Woburn Sands railway station

Of these, Milton Keynes Central is the largest and busiest.